Luciobarbus biscarensis is a species of ray-finned fish in the genus Luciobarbus. it is endemic to Algeria.

References 
 

Luciobarbus
Fish described in 1911